Gubernatorial elections were held on 10 September 2017 in 17 federal subjects of Russia.

Sixteen federal subjects had direct elections of governors. In Adygea, the governor was elected by the region's parliament. All seventeen of the new governors were nominated by ruling party United Russia.

Results

Direct election
Source:

1 Internationally recognised as part of Ukraine, see political status of Crimea and 2014 Crimean crisis for details

Vote in Parliament
The number of votes in Adygea:

See also
2017 Russian regional elections

References

2017 elections in Russia
2017
September 2017 events in Russia